John Finley was a pioneer settler of western Pennsylvania.  He was born in Cecil County, Maryland and served in the American Revolution.  After the war, he moved to Pennsylvania, and in 1788, purchased a land grant known as "Mount Pleasant" from James Barclay.

References

1759 births
1846 deaths
People from Cecil County, Maryland